USS Benfold (DDG-65) is a Flight I  in the United States Navy. She is a multi-mission platform capable of anti-aircraft warfare (AAW) with the powerful Aegis Combat System suite and anti-aircraft missiles, anti-submarine warfare (ASW), with towed sonar array, anti-submarine rockets, anti-surface warfare (ASUW) with Harpoon missiles, and strategic land strike using Tomahawk missiles. Benfold was one of the first ships fitted with the Aegis Ballistic Missile Defense System and during the 2010 Stellar Daggers exercise was the first ship to simultaneously engage a ballistic missile and a cruise missile.

Former Benfold commanding officers include Admiral Mark Ferguson, Admiral Michael Gilday, Vice Admiral Thomas H. Copeman III, and author D. Michael Abrashoff.

Design, construction and improvements

Built by the Ingalls Shipbuilding Corporation in Pascagoula, Mississippi, Benfold is the 15th of a planned 90 Arleigh Burke-class guided missile destroyers. Named for posthumous Korean War United States Marine Corps Medal of Honor recipient Hospital Corpsman Third Class Edward Clyde Benfold, she joined the U.S. Pacific Fleet for service on 30 March 1996.

Equipped with the Aegis air-defense system and the Mark-41 Vertical Launch System for multiple types of guided missiles, Benfold is capable of defensive and offensive operations against warplanes, anti-ship missiles, surface ships, submarines, and shore targets. In addition to her missiles, she carries one 5-inch rapid-fire naval gun for action against surface ships and for shore bombardment. She also carries anti-submarine torpedoes, and two Phalanx CIWS anti-missile guns. She has a flight deck for MH-60R/S Seahawk Helicopters and is capable of refueling and re-arming these helicopters, but she does not have a hangar for storing and maintaining helicopters.

Modernization 2011

In 2011, Benfold entered drydock at BAE Systems, San Diego to receive an extensive $32 million mid-life upgrade. The hull mechanical and electrical (HM&E) upgrades included a fully integrated bridge, improved machinery and damage control, quality of life improvements, an advanced galley, and commercial-off-the-shelf computing equipment.

Modernization 2013
In 2013, Benfold underwent extensive combat systems upgrades to include the installation of Aegis Baseline 9C, Ballistic Missile Defense version 5.0, A(V) 15 SONAR Suite, and also became Cooperative Engagement Capability (CEC) capable.

Service history

Deployments 
 14 Augusst 1997 to 19 February 1998 - Persian Gulf
 18 June 1999 to 17 December 1999 - Pacific Ocean/Persian Gulf
 13 March 2001 to 15 September 2001 - Persian Gulf
 18 October 2004 to 1 March 2005
 13 September to 2006 13 March 2007
 4 May 2008 to 3 November 2008
 8 September 2009 to 16 March 2010
 15 June 2012 to 11 January 2013 - Persian Gulf
 2 October 2015  to present - U.S. 7th Fleet, Yokosuka, Japan

Naval exercises 2012

In 2012, USS Benfold was the first San Diego-based naval ship invited to participate in the Koa Kai naval exercises. Benfold conducted integrated flight operations, anti-surface and anti-submarine training, dynamic ship maneuvers, ballistic missile defense, small boat attacks and Maritime Interdiction Operations (MIO) utilizing the Visit, Board, Search and Seizure (VBSS) team.

Collision 2017
On 19 November 2017 Benfold was involved in a minor collision with a Japanese commercial tug off Sagami Bay. The tug lost power and drifted into Benfold, causing damage described as minimal, with some scraping to the ship's side. There were no injuries reported on either vessel; Benfold continued at sea, while the tug was towed to Yokosuka.

Freedom of Navigation Operations 
Benfold has conducted the following Freedom of Navigation Operations (FONOPS) in the South China Sea:
 12 July 2021 - Paracel Islands
 8 September 2021 - Spratly Islands
 18 January 2022 - Spratly Islands
 20 January 2022 - Paracel Islands
 13 July 2022 - Paracel Islands
 16 July 2022 - Spratly Islands

Awards 
2003–2004 – USS Arizona Memorial Trophy Award, for "superior performance in combat readiness and battle efficiency."
1998 – Spokane Trophy
 Navy Unit Commendation for 01-Oct-1997 to 30-Apr-1998
 Meritorious Unit Commendation as a part of the Constellation Battle Group for 01-Jan-1999 to 10-Sep-2001
 Armed Forces Expeditionary Medal, for four separate time periods between October 1997 and August 2001
 Humanitarian Service Medal for Operation Unified Assistance from 28-Dec-2004 to 12-Feb-2005

Benfold has been awarded the Navy Battle "E" for the following years: 1997, 1999, 2001, 2003 (listed as "BENFOLD DDG 76" on awards site, year of Benfold DDG-65 / Higgins DDG-76 "Sea Swap"), 2004, 2005, 2007, 2009 & 2018.

References

External links 

 

 

1994 ships
Destroyers of the United States
Arleigh Burke-class destroyers
Ships built in Pascagoula, Mississippi